Vanguardism in the context of Leninist revolutionary struggle, relates to a  strategy whereby the most class-conscious and politically "advanced" sections of the proletariat or working class, described as the revolutionary vanguard, form organizations. They take actions to draw larger sections of the working class toward revolutionary politics and to serve as manifestations of proletarian political power opposed to the bourgeoisie.

Foundations

Vladimir Lenin popularised political vanguardism as conceptualised by Karl Kautsky, detailing his thoughts in one of his earlier works, What is to be done?. Lenin argued that Marxism's complexity and the hostility of the establishment (the autocratic, semi-feudal state of Imperial Russia) required that a close-knit group of individuals pulled from the working class vanguard to safeguard the revolutionary ideology within the particular circumstances presented by the Tsarist régime (Russian Empire) at the time. While Lenin wished for a revolutionary organisation akin to the contemporary Social Democratic Party of Germany, which was open to the public and more democratic in organisation, the Russian autocracy prevented this.

Leninists argue that Lenin's ideal vanguard party would have open membership: "The members of the Party are they who accept the principles of the Party program and render the Party all possible support." This party could, in theory, be completely transparent: the "entire political arena is as open to the public view as is a theatre stage to the audience". A party that supposedly implemented democracy to such an extent that "the general control (in the literal sense of the term) exercised over every act of a party man in the political field brings into existence an automatically operating mechanism which produces what in biology is called the "survival of the fittest"". This party would be completely open to the public eye while educating the proletariat to remove the false consciousness that had been instilled in them.

In its first phase, the vanguard party would exist for two reasons. Firstly, it would protect Marxism from outside corruption from other ideas, as well as advance its concepts. Secondly, it would educate the proletariat in Marxism in order to cleanse them of their "false individual consciousness" and instill the revolutionary "class consciousness" in them.

If the party is successful in this goal, on the eve of revolution, a critical mass of the working class population would be prepared to usher forth the transformation of society. Furthermore, a great number of them, namely their most dedicated members, would belong to the party cadres as professional revolutionaries, and would be elected to leadership positions by the mass party membership. Thus the organisation would quickly include the entire working class.

Political party

A vanguard party is a political party at the fore of a mass-action political movement and of a revolution. In the praxis of political science, the concept of the vanguard party, composed of professional revolutionaries, was first effected by the Bolshevik Party in the Russian Revolution of 1917. Lenin, the first leader of the Bolsheviks, coined the term vanguard party, and argued that such a party was necessary in order to provide the practical and political leadership that would impel the proletariat to achieve a communist revolution. Hence, as a political-science concept and term, vanguard party most often is associated with Leninism; however, similar concepts (under different names) also are present in other revolutionary ideologies.

Friedrich Engels and Karl Marx presented the concept of the vanguard party as solely qualified to politically lead the proletariat in revolution; in Chapter II: "Proletarians and Communists" of The Communist Manifesto (1848), they said:

 The Communists, therefore, are, on the one hand, practically the most advanced and resolute section of the working-class parties of every country, that section which pushes forward all others; on the other hand, theoretically, they have over the great mass of the proletariat the advantage of clearly understanding the lines of march, the conditions, and the ultimate general results of the proletarian movement. The immediate aim of the Communists is the same as that of all other proletarian parties: Formation of the proletariat into a class, overthrow of the bourgeois supremacy, conquest of political power by the proletariat.

According to Lenin, the purpose of the vanguard party is to establish a dictatorship of the proletariat; a rule of the working class. The change of ruling class, from the bourgeoisie to the proletariat, makes possible the full development of socialism. In early 20th-century Russia, Lenin argued that the vanguard party would lead the revolution to depose the incumbent Tsarist government, and transfer government power to the working class. In the pamphlet What is to be Done? (1902), Lenin said that a revolutionary vanguard party, mostly recruited from the working class, should lead the political campaign, because it was the only way that the proletariat could successfully achieve a revolution; unlike the economist campaign of trade union struggle advocated by other socialist political parties and later by the anarcho-syndicalists. Like Karl Marx, Lenin distinguished between the two aspects of a revolution, the economic campaign (labour strikes for increased wages and work concessions), which featured diffused plural leadership; and the political campaign (socialist changes to society), which featured the decisive revolutionary leadership of the Bolshevik vanguard party.

Marxism–Leninism

As he surveyed the European milieu in the late 1890s, Lenin found several theoretic problems with the Marxism of the late 19th century. Contrary to what Karl Marx had predicted, capitalism had become stronger in the last third of the 19th century. In Western Europe, the working class had become poorer, rather than becoming politically progressive, thinking people; hence, the workers and their trade unions, although they had continued to militate for better wages and working conditions, had failed to develop a revolutionary class consciousness, as predicted by Marx. To explain that undeveloped political awareness, Lenin said that the division of labour in a bourgeois capitalist society prevented the emergence of a proletarian class consciousness, because of the ten-to-twelve-hour workdays that the workers laboured in factories, and so had no time to learn and apply the philosophic complexities of Marxist theory. Finally, in trying to effect a revolution in Tsarist Imperial Russia (1721–1917), Lenin faced the problem of an autocratic régime that had outlawed almost all political activity. Although the Tsarist autocracy could not enforce a ban on political ideas, until 1905—when Tsar Nicholas II (ruled 1894–1917) agreed to the formation of a national duma—the Okhrana, the Tsarist secret police, suppressed every political group seeking social and political changes, including those with a democratic program. To counter such political conditions, Lenin said that a professional revolutionary organisation was necessary to organise and lead the most class-conscious workers into a politically coherent movement. Concerning the Russian class struggle, in the book What Is to Be Done? (1902), against the "economist" trend of the socialist parties (who proposed that the working class would develop a revolutionary consciousness from demanding solely economic improvements), Lenin said that the "history of all countries bears out the fact that, through their own powers alone, the working class can develop only a trade-union consciousness"; and that under reformist, trade-union leadership, the working class could only engage spontaneous local rebellions to improve their political position within the capitalist system, and that revolutionary consciousness developed unevenly. Nonetheless, optimistic about the working class's ability to develop a revolutionary class consciousness, Lenin said that the missing element for escalating the class struggle to revolution was a political organisation that could relate to the radicalism of political vanguard of the working class, who then would attract many workers from the middling policies of the reformist leaders of the trade unions.

It is often believed that Lenin thought the bearers of class consciousness were the common intellectuals who made it their vocation to conspire against the capitalist system, educate the public in revolutionary theory, and prepare the workers for the proletarian revolution and the dictatorship of the proletariat that would follow. Yet, unlike his Menshevik rivals, Lenin distinguished himself by his hostility towards the bourgeois intelligentsia, and was routinely criticised for placing too much trust in the intellectual ability of the working class to transform society through its own political struggles.

Like other political organisations that sought to change Imperial Russian society, Lenin's Bolshevik Party resorted to conspiracy, and operated in the political underground. Against Tsarist repression, Lenin argued for the necessity of confining membership to people who were professionally trained to combat the Okhrana; however, at its core, the Bolshevik Party was an exceptionally flexible organisation who pragmatically adapted policy to changing political situations. After the Revolution of 1905, Lenin proposed that the Bolshevik Party "open its gates" to the militant working class, who were rapidly becoming political radicals, in order for the Party to become a mass-action political party with genuine roots in the working class movement.

The notion of a 'vanguard', as used by Lenin before 1917, did not necessarily imply single-party rule. Lenin considered the Social-Democrats (Bolsheviks) the leading elements of a multi-class (and multi-party) democratic struggle against Tsarism. Even after the October Revolution, the Bolsheviks (now renamed the Communist Party) operated in the Soviets, trade unions, and other working-class mass organisations in a milieu with other revolutionary parties, such as Mensheviks, Social-Revolutionaries and anarcho-communists, and local soviets often elected non-Bolshevik majorities. In this context, Lenin considered the Bolsheviks the vanguard insofar as they were the most consistent defenders of Soviet power (which he considered the dictatorship of the proletariat or 'Commune-state'). However, this situation changed drastically during the Russian Civil War and economic collapse, which decimated the working class and its independent institutions, and saw the development of irreconcilable conflicts between the Bolsheviks and their rivals. At the 10th Congress of the Russian Communist Party (Bolsheviks) in 1921, the Party made the de facto reality de jure by outlawing opposition parties and formalising single-Party rule.

Thus, the concept of a vanguard party was used by the Bolsheviks to justify their suppression of other parties. They took the line that since they were the vanguard of the proletariat, their right to rule could not be legitimately questioned. Hence, opposition parties could not be permitted to exist. From 1936 onward, Communist-inspired state constitutions enshrined this concept by giving the Communist parties a "leading role" in society—a provision that was interpreted to either ban other parties altogether or force them to accept the Communists' guaranteed right to rule as a condition of being allowed to exist.

In the 20th century, the Communist Party of the Soviet Union (CPSU) continued regarding itself as the institutionalisation of Marxist–Leninist political consciousness in the Soviet Union; therein lay the justification for its political control of Soviet society. Article 6 of the 1977 Soviet Constitution refers to the CPSU as the "leading and guiding force of Soviet society, and the nucleus of its political system, of all state organizations and public organizations". The CPSU, precisely because it was the bearer of Marxist–Leninist ideology, determined the general development of society, directed domestic and foreign policy, and "imparts a planned, systematic, and theoretically substantiated character" to the struggle of the Soviet people for the victory of communism.

Nonetheless, the political role of the vanguard party, as outlined by Lenin, is disputed among  the contemporary communist movement. Lenin's contemporary in the Bolshevik Party, Leon Trotsky, further developed and established the vanguard party with the creation of the Fourth International. Trotsky, who believed in permanent revolution, proposed that a vanguard party must be an international political party who organised the most militant activists of the working classes of the countries of the world.

Other uses
Although Lenin honed the idea in terms of a class leadership forged out of a proletarian vanguard specifically to describe Marxist–Leninist parties, the term is also used for many kinds of movement conceiving themselves as initially guided by a small elite. Theodor Herzl, the theorist of Zionism, thought legitimation from the majority would only hinder from the outset his movement, and therefore advised that "we cannot all be of one mind; the gestor will therefore simply take the leadership into his hands and march in the van."

This principle antedated by some years the Leninist idea of Bolshevism as the vanguard of the revolution by characterizing the 'Zionist movement as a vanguard of the Jewish people.' The Youth Guard at the forefront of Zionist mobilization in the Yishuv likewise conceived of itself as a revolutionary vanguard, and the kibbutz movement itself is said to have thought of itself as a 'selfless vanguard'. It is occasionally used with of certain Islamist parties. Writers Abul Ala Maududi and Sayyid Qutb both urged the formation of an Islamic vanguard to restore Islamic society. Qutb talked of an Islamist vanguard in his book Ma'alim fi al-Tariq (Milestones) and Maududi formed the radical Islamist party Jamaat-e-Islami in Pakistan whose goal was to establish a pan-Ummah worldwide Islamist ideological state starting from Pakistan, administered for God (Allah) solely by Muslims "whose whole life is devoted to the observance and enforcement" of Islamic law (Shari'ah), leading to the world becoming the House of Islam. The party members formed an elite group (called arkan) with "affiliates" (mutaffiq) and then "sympathizers" (hamdard) beneath them. Today, the Jamaat-e-Islami has spread wings to other South Asian countries with large Muslim populations, such as Afghanistan, Bangladesh and India. The literature of the Baháʼí Faith also frequently refers to those serving to raise the capacities of communities around the world as the "vanguard" of the Cause of Baha'u'llah

According to Roger Eatwell, some fascist parties have also operated in ways similar to the concept of a vanguard party.

See also
 Maoism
 Foco
 Avant-garde
 Blanquism
 Democratic centralism
 Jacobinism

References

Further reading 
Arts
 Burger, Peter. Theory of the Avant-Garde. Theory & History of Literature Series. 135 pages. University of Minnesota Press, February 1, 1984. .
 Forster, Merlin H. and K. David Jackson, compilers. Vanguardism in Latin American Literature : An Annotated Bibliographic Guide. Bibliographies and Indexes in World Literature Series. 232 pages. Greenwood Press, May 23, 1990. .
 Maerhofer, John.  2009.  Rethinking the Vanguard: Aesthetic and Political Positions in the Modernist Debate, 1917-1962.  New Castle: Cambridge Scholars Press.  

Politics
 Vladimir Lenin  What is to be done?
 Yevgeny Bugaev. What Is the Party? Moscow: Progress Publishers. 1986.
 Bakunin, Mikhail. "Letter to Albert Richard". August 1870. Reprinted in Bakunin on Anarchy, translated and edited by Sam Dolgoff. A. A. Knopf, 1st edition, 1972. . Retrieved May 17, 2005.
 Gray, Phillip W.  2020.  Vanguardism: Ideology and Organization in Totalitarian Politics.  London: Routledge. 
 Mandel, Ernest. "Trotsky’s conception of self-organisation and the vanguard party".  Originally published in French in Quatrième Internationale, No.36, pp. 35–49. November 1989. Translated by Mike Murray, marked up by Einde O’Callaghan for the Marxists’ Internet Archive. Retrieved May 24, 2005.
 Mitchell, Roxanne and Frank Weiss. Two, Three, Many Parties of a New Type? Against the Ultra-Left Line. Publisher: United Labor Press. 1977. Retrieved May 25, 2005.
 Slaughter, Cliff. "What is Revolutionary Leadership?". Labour Review.  Socialist Labor League.  1964?. Retrieved May 17, 2005.

Polemics
 Mythology of the White-Led "Vanguard": A Critical Look at the Revolutionary Communist Party, USA.  Anarchist People of Color website. Retrieved May 17, 2005.
 Cooper, Nick. Critique of Revolutionary Communism . Belgium Indymedia. Sep. 23, 2004.  Retrieved June 3, 2005.

Communist terminology
Ideology of the Communist Party of the Soviet Union
Leninism
Political theories
Political parties
Revolution terminology
Stalinism